Budshah Bridge, locally also known as Budshah Kadal, is a concrete bridge located in the Srinagar city of the Indian union territory of Jammu and Kashmir. It was first built in 1957 during the rule of Bakshi Ghulam Mohammad and is named after the 15th Century ruler of Kashmir, Zain-ul-Abidin, popularly known as Budshah (the Great King).

The bridge is also known as Alamgir Bridge. It is located more than 100 metres downstream of Amira Kadal and handles most of the vehicular traffic from the Civil Secretariat to the Maulana Azad Road. In 2017, colourful fountains were installed on either side of the bridge as part of a beautification programme for the city.

See also
Zero Bridge
Abdullah Bridge
Amira Kadal

References 

Bridges in Srinagar
Buildings and structures in Srinagar
Bridges over the Jhelum River
Bridges in Jammu and Kashmir
Bridges completed in the 20th century
Concrete bridges
Transport in Srinagar
20th-century architecture in India